Actinopolyspora mortivallis is a bacterium with type strain HS-1 (= JCM 7550).

References

Further reading

External links

LPSN
Type strain of Actinopolyspora mortivallis at BacDive -  the Bacterial Diversity Metadatabase

Actinomycetia
Bacteria described in 1991